A Persian, Persian roll or Pershing is a fried sweet roll or doughnut with a spiral shape similar to a cinnamon bun. It may be covered with a sugar glaze, iced or frosted, or sprinkled with sugar or cinnamon sugar.

Regional variations
In Thunder Bay, Ontario, Canada, it is credited to have originated at Bennett's Bakery in Port Arthur, where it is served with a sweet, pink icing made of either raspberries or strawberries. Traditional lore is that the Persian was named for U.S. general John "Blackjack" Pershing but the exact date of its inception and circumstances of its creation are no longer known, giving rise to competing claims and stories. Its recipe remains a general secret, with long-running debates on whether the icing contains raspberries or strawberries. Persians are often used as fundraising items to be sold at schools, churches, shopping malls, and other social events. They may be served "toasted" – sliced in half, heated in a frying pan and iced on both sides.

Persians are popular in the US states of Wisconsin and Maine. In Camden, Maine, they were historically made with chocolate frosting. In Lehighton, Pennsylvania, they were served with chocolate or vanilla icing with a dollop of cherry–strawberry glaze.  A version is also sold as a "Pershing Donut" at Titus Bakery in Lebanon, Indiana.

References

Canadian desserts
Cuisine of Ontario
Culture of Thunder Bay
Sweet breads
American doughnuts